The Dishon Stream (Nahal Dishon) is an  intermittent stream/wadi in Upper Galilee, Israel. It ins of 26 miles long, starts on the eastern slope of Mount Meron and drains into the Jordan River in the area of the drained . It is one of the largest streams in East Upper Galilee. Its name is a modification of the name of the depopulated Palestinian village of Dayshum. 

mindat.org reports the following Arabic names associated with the stream:  Wadi 'Uba (Ouadi Ouba), Wadi Fara, Wādi Hindāj, Wadi Nab' el Balat, Wadi Nasir.

Parts of the Israel National Trail run through the Dishon valley.

Parts of the stream are in the Nahal Dishon Reserve (the central part of the stream) and the  Reserve (parts of the slopes of the valley).

Major tributaries: :he:נחל אביב, :he:נחל גוש חלב, :he:נחל צבעון.

Route 886 runs along the Dishon Stream for the whole length of the Dishon Stream Reserve. It used to be marked for SUV access, which was prohibited in the stream area in  2013.

References

Tributaries of the Jordan River
Rivers of Israel
Nature reserves in Israel